Ioannis "Giannis" Bezos (born 10 September 1956 in Athens) is a Greek actor and director, widely considered one of the best Greek comedic actors of all time, performing on TV and in the theatre. He has also acted in five films.

Biography 
The person who discovered Bezos first was Thymios Karakatsanis, at a performance at Smaroula theatre. Initially, he worked with Aliki Vougiouklaki on stage. He went on to have a number of TV hits: Oi Aparadektoi (1991–92, 1992–93), Tis Ellados ta Paidia (1993–95), Ekeines Kai Ego (1996-98), Flower-spread Life (1998–99), Akros oikogeneiakon (2001-3), Eftyhismenoi Mazi (2007–10), My Daughter's Marriage (2010) and Clinical Case (2011). In many of the TV series in which he starred and stars, he has cooperated with the director Andreas Morfonios, with whom he has a close friendship, while some of these are directed by Bezos himself.

Also, he starred in various theatrical performances in the 1980s including Frogs and Lysistrata. In March 2009, the theatrical hit La Cage Aux Folles, a Jean Poiret French musical, starring Bezos, made its premiere at Pallas theatre, with direction by Stamatis Fasoulis.

Bezos is also famous for his singing, which he often demonstrates while performing. Consequently, he has featured in musical performances, periodical cooperations and on records (at Giorgos Hatzinasiou, Notis Mavroudis and Thanos Mikroutsikos records). Since 1987, he has been married to actress Natalia Tsaliki, who has featured alongside Bezos many times on TV and stage. They have a daughter, Iro Bezou (1988).

In April 2016, the Hellenic Broadcasting Corporation announced Bezos would host a new television series, "Speaking of Theatre" («Μιλώντας για θέατρο»), on ERT2, Bezos's first TV hosting role  for some time.

Filmography

Television

Theatre 
 A hero with flip-flops (2014–15)
 Nefeles (2012)
 Fraudmen and Gentlemen (2012)
 May the Wife be Afraid of her Husband (2010-2011)
 Don Juan (2010)
 The Imaginary Invalid (2009)
 La Cage Aux Folles (2009-2010)
 Hotel Paradise (2007-2008)
 Marriage Words (2006-2007)
 The Birds (2006)
 Le Bourgeois gentilhomme (2005)
 Lysistrata (2004)
 Laterna, Ftohia kai Filotimo (1999-2000)
 The Frogs (1998)
 Lift the anchors up! (1997-1998)

References

External links 

Greek male actors
Greek male voice actors
Greek film directors
Greek theatre directors
1956 births
Living people
Male actors from Athens